Hular-e Olya (also Romanized as Hūlār-e ‘Olyā; also known as Bālā Hūlār and Hūlār-e Bālā) is a village in Kolijan Rostaq-e Olya Rural District, Kolijan Rostaq District, Sari County, Mazandaran Province, Iran. At the 2006 census, its population was 166, in 55 families.

References 

Populated places in Sari County